David Stuart Mitchell (born 13 June 1962) is a former professional association footballer who most recently worked as head coach of Malaysian Premier League club Kedah FA. A powerful striker, he is remembered as one of the pioneers for Australian players in Europe, appearing in the Bundesliga, the Eredivisie, Scottish Premier League, Süper Lig, as well as the top-flight and second tier in England. In Asia, he played for clubs in Hong Kong and Malaysia.

Mitchell played for overseas clubs for more than a dozen years before returning to Australia to coach Sydney Olympic, Sydney United and Parramatta Power in the National Soccer League. Born in Scotland, he represented the Australia national team at international level. He played 44 times for the national team, scoring a total of 14 goals and a number of assists, and appearing in the 1988 Summer Olympic Games in Seoul.

He was the assistant manager to Ron Smith at A-League club Perth Glory before taking the top position after Smith's sacking, helping the club end its winless streak.

Playing career 
Mitchell was born in Glasgow, but moved to Adelaide as a young child. He bought out his own contract at Adelaide City so he could join Rangers, the club that his family supported, in 1983. He broke into the first team at the same time as acclaimed Scotland striker Ally McCoist. Both he and McCoist scored their first goals for the club in the same Scottish League Cup game and he also represented the Glasgow club on the European stage.

In 1985, Mitchell became the first Australian to feature in the Bundesliga, playing for two seasons for Eintracht Frankfurt. He also played for Dutch football club Feyenoord—appearing in the UEFA Cup—before securing a move to Chelsea in the top flight of English football. He also played – and scored – on-loan for Newcastle United becoming first Aussie to play and score for the famous North-East club.

Playing in the second-tier of English football, he had spells at Swindon Town where he played with Glenn Hoddle and helped them earn promotion to the English Premier League and Millwall where he scored 15 league goals in 55 games. He then moved to Malaysia and scored the winner in the 1995 Malaysia Cup final; this was a golden goal, the first golden goal to be scored in a Malaysia Cup final.

Mitchell finished his career with Australian clubs Sydney Olympic and Sydney United as he transitioned into coaching.

Managerial career 
Mitchell's coaching career in the NSL spanned six seasons and 154 matches, in which he recorded 68 wins, 31 draws and 55 losses. When he returned from playing in Europe he was a player/coach for clubs Sydney Olympic and Sydney United. Some of his coaching achievements include a Grand Final appearance in 1998–99 with Sydney United and also being the inaugural coach of Parramatta Power in 1999–2000.

Mitchell was appointed interim head coach of Perth Glory after the sacking of Ron Smith in November 2007 and was then given a contract until March 2009. It was further extended to the end of the 2010–11 season in November 2008. Some of his major achievements while manager of Perth Glory was to sign key international players including Robbie Fowler and Andy Todd.

Mitchell stepped down as Perth Glory coach during the 2010–11 A-League season after an unbeaten run of five games until his side conceded four consecutive losses. He decided to move to the role of Director of Football. Mitchell then moved Ian Ferguson to the head coaching role to replace himself. Both positions were for the 2010–11 and 2011–12 seasons. On 4 March 2011, Mitchell was released from his contract from the club after the role was deemed redundant after an independent review of football operations at Perth Glory.

In November 2013, Malaysian Premier League club Kedah FA announced on its website that Mitchell had been appointed head coach and was preparing for the 2014 Premier League season. But despite the Red Eagles' solid start to the 2014 campaign and a Malaysia FA Cup quarterfinal appearance, he was sacked in April due to political in-fighting within the club.

2014 worked as a pundit for Astro TV for the EPL in Malaysia and also for the Brazil World cup 2014

2015 he was engaged by Mike Charlsworth the owner of Central Coast Mariners FC in the Australian A League as GM of Asia. This was for possible connections and joint ventures in the growing Asia market.

Worked with Frenz United in Malaysia with ex Liverpool legend Steve McMahon to help bring the under 19's of Frenz United to the final of the Asian Championship trophy where they were defeated by a robust and tough Japanese team Kashima Antlers in the final.

2015 – 2016 in the past Mitchell has also work as a scout for Feyenoord Rotterdam and is currently their Asian Ambassador for the club.

2016 worked for Astro TV as a pundit for the EPL

2017 worked for ESPNFC as a pundit for Australia's 2018 World Cup playoff against Syria.

Career statistics 
Scores and results list goal tally first.

Managerial statistics

Honours

Player 
Rangers
 Scottish League Cup: 1984–85

Seiko
Hong Kong League: 1984–85
Hong Kong Cup: 1984–85

Swindon Town
 First Division Play-Off Final: 1993

Selangor
 Malaysia Cup: 1995

Australia
Trans-Tasman: 1983
Merlion Cup: 1982

Individual
 FFA Hall of Champions: 2006 Inductee
NSL U21 Player of the Year: 1980–81 (Papasavas Medal)

Manager 
 Sydney United
NSL Premiership: 1998–99

 Individual
NSL Coach of the Year: 1998–99

References

External links 
 
 OZ Football profile

1962 births
Living people
Australian soccer players
Australian soccer coaches
Rangers F.C. players
Eintracht Frankfurt players
Feyenoord players
Chelsea F.C. players
NEC Nijmegen players
Newcastle United F.C. players
Swindon Town F.C. players
Altay S.K. footballers
Millwall F.C. players
Seiko SA players
Sydney Olympic FC players
Sydney United 58 FC players
Perth Glory FC managers
Scottish footballers
Scottish Football League players
Eredivisie players
Bundesliga players
Hong Kong First Division League players
Australia international soccer players
Olympic soccer players of Australia
Footballers at the 1988 Summer Olympics
Sydney Olympic FC managers
Central Coast Mariners FC non-playing staff
British expatriates in Hong Kong
Australian expatriate soccer players
Australian expatriate sportspeople in England
Australian expatriate sportspeople in Germany
Expatriate footballers in Germany
Australian expatriate sportspeople in the Netherlands
Expatriate footballers in the Netherlands
Expatriate footballers in England
Australian expatriate sportspeople in Turkey
Expatriate footballers in Turkey
Australian expatriate sportspeople in Hong Kong
Expatriate footballers in Hong Kong
Australian expatriate sportspeople in Malaysia
Expatriate footballers in Malaysia
Footballers from Glasgow
Scottish emigrants to Australia
Scottish expatriate football managers
Australian expatriate soccer coaches
National Soccer League (Australia) players
A-League Men managers
Sydney United 58 FC managers
Association football forwards
Australian expatriate sportspeople in Scotland
Soccer players from Adelaide